Shur Bolagh (also Romanized as Shūr Bolāgh; also known as Shūr Bolāch and Shūr Bulāq) is a village in Horr Rural District, Dinavar District, Sahneh County, Kermanshah Province, Iran. At the 2006 census, its population was 94, in 23 families.

References 

Populated places in Sahneh County